The Sasang constitutional medicine (Hangul: 사상의학. Hanja: 四象醫學) or Sasang typology is a typological constitution medicine of Traditional Korean medicine. It was systematized by Yi Je-ma in his book Longevity and Life Preservation in Eastern Medicine (東醫壽世保元, 동의수세보원) in 1894. It divides people into four body types based on their biopsychosocial traits. The classification was derived from the five body types of Traditional Chinese medicine described in an ancient Chinese medical book Lingshu Jing of Huangdi Neijing.

Classification system

Sasang typology divides people into four types based on their biopsychosocial traits with a combination of yin/yang and greater/lesser: tae-yang ( 태양) or "greater yang"; so-yang (소양) or "lesser yang"; tae-eum (태음) or "greater yin"; and so-eum (소음) or "lesser yin".

Each type consists of a classification of pathology, medicine and hygiene depending on personality, psychological status and organ functionality. It is considered that one cannot escape the category of biological body type, and the strengths and weaknesses of organs, both major and minor, depend on the type.

Body Types

Tae-yang
Tae-yang have large lungs and a small liver. They have superiority in function, and often have feelings of inferiority.

Tae-eum
Tae-eum have a large liver and small lungs. They are tall and the majority gain a lot of weight. They are patient and have a reserved personality. Therefore, if they are given a task, they will not give up, no matter what task it is. Because of this personality, they are prone to gambling.

So-yang
The so-yang type has a large spleen, and small kidneys. They have whitish skin. Like so-eum, many of this type are skinny.

So-eum
The so-eum type have large kidneys and a small spleen. They are short, and many are skinny. Due to weak intestines, they very often have digestive problems. Many enjoy a meat diet.

References

Further reading
 Soo Jin Lee, Soo Hyun Park, and Han Chae (December 2012). "Temperament profiles of Sasang typology in a child clinical sample". Integrative Medicine Research, Vol. 1, No. 1, pp. 21–25. Elsevier
 Han Chae (March 2015). "The multidisciplinary study on Sasang typology".  Integrative Medicine Research, Vol. 4, No. 1, pp. 1–3. Elsevier
 Kyungwoo Sohn, Ansuk Jeong, Miyoung Yoon, Sunkyung Lee, Sangmoon Hwang, and Han Chae(December 2012). "Genetic Characteristics of Sasang Typology: A Systematic Review". Journal of Acupuncture and Meridian Studies. Vol. 5, No. 6, pp. 271–289. Medical Association of Pharmacopuncture Institute
 Soo Jin Lee, Soo Hyun Park, C Robert Cloninger, Yun Hee Kim, Minwoo Hwang and Han Chae (2014). "Biopsychological traits of Sasang typology based on Sasang personality questionnaire and body mass index". BMC Complementary and Alternative Medicine, Vol. 14, No. 1. International Society for Complementary Medicine Research

Traditional Korean medicine